Snowy Mountains National Forest was established as the Snowy Mountains Forest Reserve by the U.S. Forest Service in Montana on November 5, 1906 with .  It became a National Forest on March 4, 1907. On July 1, 1908 the entire forest was combined with Little Belt, Snowy Mountains and Little Rockies National Forests to establish Jefferson National Forest (Montana) and the name was discontinued.

The forest is part of the Jefferson Division of Lewis and Clark National Forest. The Big Snowy Mountains and part of the Little Snowy Mountains are included in the unit, primarily in Fergus and Golden Valley Counties. A Wilderness Study Area has been designated in the Big Snowies.

See also
 List of forests in Montana

References

External links
Lewis and Clark National Forest
Forest History Society
Listing of the National Forests of the United States and Their Dates (from Forest History Society website) Text from Davis, Richard C., ed. Encyclopedia of American Forest and Conservation History. New York: Macmillan Publishing Company for the Forest History Society, 1983. Vol. II, pp. 743-788.

Former National Forests of Montana
Protected areas of Fergus County, Montana
Protected areas of Golden Valley County, Montana
1906 establishments in Montana
Protected areas established in 1906
Protected areas disestablished in 1908
1908 disestablishments in Montana